Oswald Theodore Avery Jr. (October 21, 1877 – February 20, 1955) was a Canadian-American physician and medical researcher.  The major part of his career was spent at the Rockefeller Hospital in New York City.  Avery was one of the first molecular biologists and  a pioneer in immunochemistry, but he is best known for the experiment (published in 1944 with his co-workers Colin MacLeod and Maclyn McCarty) that isolated DNA as the material of which genes and chromosomes are made.

The Nobel laureate Arne Tiselius said that Avery was the most deserving scientist not to receive the Nobel Prize for his work, though he was nominated for the award throughout the 1930s, 1940s, and 1950s.

The lunar crater Avery was named in his honor.

Early life and education 
Avery was born in Halifax, Nova Scotia in 1877 to Francis Joseph Avery, a Baptist minister, and his wife Elizabeth Crowdy. The couple had immigrated from Britain in 1873. Oswald Avery was born and grew up in a small wooden row house on Moran Street in the North End of Halifax, now a designated heritage building. When Avery was 10, his family moved to the Lower East Side of New York City. Avery earned his undergraduate degree at Colgate University and was a member of the Class of 1900. Avery studied music at first and then switched to medicine at college, earning his medical degree and beginning a practice in 1904.

Rockefeller Institute
In 1913, Rufus Cole, who had noticed some of Avery's publications, offered him a position at the recently opened Rockefeller Hospital, a facility for clinical research and part of the Rockefeller Institute. Avery accepted. At the institute, Cole, Avery and Alphonse Dochez developed the first effective immune serum against a strain of pneumococcus, a bacterium causing pneumonia. The serum was produced from the blood of infected horses.

Debate over the pathogen in the 1918 influenza epidemic
At the height of the 1918 influenza epidemic, the dominant hypothesis was that the causative agent in the disease was a bacterium — specifically, Haemophilus influenzae (then called 'Pfeiffer's bacillus' or Bacillus influenzae), 
a microbe first isolated by German bacteriologist Richard Pfeiffer, which he had identified in nasal samples of patients infected by seasonal influenza decades earlier and which was also found in many but not all samples taken from patients in the 1918 epidemic.  The failure to isolate B. influenzae in some patients was generally attributed to the difficulty of culturing the bacterium.

Peter Olitsky and Frederick Gates at the Rockefeller Institute found that nasal secretions from infected patients could still cause disease in the lungs of rabbits after having been filtered through a bacterium-excluding Berkefeld filter, but other researchers were unable to reproduce their results. Avery initially doubted Olitsky's and Gates's data, and set out to prove the B. influenzae hypothesis. For that purpose, he developed improved culture media for B. influenzae, which were widely adopted and reduced the possibility of false negatives. However, B. influenzae could still not be found in all influenza patients. The true cause of influenza, a virus, would not be discovered until the 1930s.

DNA as the basis for genes

After the influenza epidemic, Avery returned to his work on pneumococcus. He identified R and S strains of the bacterium; the latter caused disease and had a polysaccharide capsule, while the former lacked the capsule and was harmless. Griffith's experiment of 1928 showed that the ability to produce a capsule could be transferred from S to R strain bacteria, even if the S strain bacteria were killed first.

For many years, genetic information was thought to be contained in cell protein. Continuing the research done by Frederick Griffith, Avery worked with Colin MacLeod and Maclyn McCarty on the mystery of inheritance. He had received emeritus status from the Rockefeller Institute in 1943, but continued working for five years, though by that time he was in his late sixties. Oswald Avery, along with Colin MacLeod and Maclyn McCarty, isolated S-strain bacteria from dead mice and killed the bacteria with heat. They used available techniques to remove various macromolecules - proteins, RNA, and DNA - from the bacteria. S-bacteria first had the large cellular structures removed. Then they were treated with protease enzymes, which removed the proteins from the cells before the remainder was placed with R strain bacteria. The R strain bacteria transformed, meaning that proteins did not carry the genes causing disease. Afterwards, the S strain bacteria were treated with ribonucleases to degrade their RNA. The R strain still transformed, suggesting that RNA was not the transforming substance. Then the remnants of the S strain bacteria were treated with a deoxyribonuclease enzyme which removed the DNA. After this treatment, the R strain bacteria no longer transformed.  This showed that DNA was the substance that transformed R strain into S strain bacteria and indicated that it was the carrier of genes in cells.

Avery's conclusion, that "The evidence presented supports the belief that a nucleic acid of the desoxyribose type is the fundamental unit of the transforming principle of Pneumococcus Type II" greatly influenced Erwin Chargaff, who upon reading those words dedicated his work to identify a "chemistry of heredity" which he later elucidated in Chargaff's rules. Chargaff would later comment that "As this transformation represents a permanently inheritable alteration of a cell, the chemical nature of the substance responsible for this alteration had been elucidated for the first time. Seldom has more been said in so few words."

Alfred Hershey and Martha Chase furthered Avery's research in 1952 with the Hershey–Chase experiment. These experiments paved the way for Watson and Crick's discovery of the helical structure of DNA, and thus the birth of modern genetics and molecular biology. Of this event, Avery wrote in a letter to his youngest brother Roy, a bacteriologist at the Vanderbilt School of Medicine: "It's lots of fun to blow bubbles but it's wiser to prick them yourself before someone else tries to."

Nobel laureate Joshua Lederberg stated that Avery and his laboratory provided "the historical platform of modern DNA research" and "betokened the molecular revolution in genetics and biomedical science generally".

Bibliography
The collected papers of Avery are stored at the Tennessee State Library and Archives and at the Rockefeller Archive. Many of his papers, poems, and hand written lab-notes are available at the National Library of Medicine in the Oswald T. Avery Collection, the first of their Profiles in Science series.

References

Further reading

 
 René Dubos, The Professor, the Institute, and DNA: Oswald T. Avery, His Life and Scientific Achievements, 1976, Paul & Company, 
 
 
 
 
 
 
 
 
 
 
 Key Participants: Oswald T. Avery - Linus Pauling and the Race for DNA: A Documentary History
 Oswald Avery Papers finding aid at the Tennessee State Library and Archives
 Oswald T. Avery Collection (1912-2005) - National Library of Medicine finding aid
 The Oswald T. Avery Collection - Profiles in Science, National Library of Medicine
 National Academy of Sciences Biographical Memoir

External links
 
 

1877 births
1955 deaths
American geneticists
American medical researchers
American microbiologists
Canadian emigrants to the United States
Canadian people of English descent
Colgate University alumni
Columbia University Vagelos College of Physicians and Surgeons alumni
Fellows of the American Academy of Arts and Sciences
Members of the United States National Academy of Sciences
Foreign Members of the Royal Society
History of genetics
People from Halifax, Nova Scotia
Recipients of the Albert Lasker Award for Basic Medical Research
Recipients of the Copley Medal
Rockefeller University people
Scientists from New York (state)